Olha Fedorivna Franko (Junior) (24 July 1896 – 27 March 1987 was a Ukrainian writer, and the creator of the first Ukrainian cookbook.

Early life and education 
Franko was born on 24 July 1896. She studied culinary cuisine at the Higher School of Agriculture in Vienna for two years.

Writing 
Franko wrote Practical Kitchen (практична кухня), published in 1929 in Kolomyia, a book focused on Galician recipes, although it also has about 20% Ukrainian recipes. It was said to be one of the first recipe books about Ukrainian cuisine.  The book was reprinted in 1991 retitled Practical Cuisine, and again in 2019 with a foreword by Marianna Dushar. It contained recipes focused on traditional dishes made from local ingredients.

In 1937, Franko published her second book National Cuisine focused on the nutritional aspects of cooking.

Advocacy 
In her book, Franko to encouraged housewives to demand food quality inspections from local authorities.

Family 
Franko is from the famous Bilevych family. After the death of his first wife (Kamenyar-Moses) she married Petro Franko, becoming the daughter-in-law of Ukrainian activist and poet Ivan Franko.

Olha Franko is often confused with her mother in law, as both have exactly the same name. Informally they went by "junior" and "senior" to avoid confusion.

Death 

In 1987, Franko died at the age of 91. Although her husband had been killed in 1941, she never learned of his fate.

References 

1987 deaths
1896 births
20th-century Ukrainian writers
Food writers
20th-century Ukrainian women writers
Women food writers